Selenarctia pseudelissa is a moth in the family Erebidae. It was described by Paul Dognin in 1902. It is found in Venezuela.

References

Moths described in 1902
Phaegopterina